Bromma Air Maintenance AB (BAM), is a Swedish company specialized in maintenance on fixed-wing and rotor-wing aircraft. Certified in accordance with EASA part-145. BAM headquarters is at Stockholm Bromma Airport in Stockholm, Sweden. BAM has subsidiaries on the Airport of Norrköping, Malmslätt Airport in Linköping and on the local airport in Sveg.

History

BAM was founded in 1979 by Ingemar Björk by the acquisition of Flygfirma I. Ehrenström, who had the Swedish agency for Gulfstream, Aero Commander and Fairchild. The company had 5 employees in those days, and among the most common planes to be maintained were Cessna Citations and Learjets.

1980, BAM became appointed service center for Raytheon Beechcraft.

1997 BAM opened a maintenance hangar on the airport in Norrköping that performed line maintenance on the commercial airliner Air Express that operated from Nice in France.

In the year of 2000, 45 mechanics, technicians and administrative staff were employed by BAM. When the former owner announced that the company was for sale, 24 of the employees joined forces and purchased BAM. The former Technical Director, Egert Lönn, was appointed as General Manager.

In 2003 BAM was appointed by the Swedish Airforce to extend their ongoing cooperation by adding line maintenance at the flight school in Malmslätt on their Jet Trainers SK 60 / Saab 105, beside the maintenance on the Airforce Beechcraft Super King Air.

Airfleet

BAM has its own fleet of two Beechcraft Super King Air. These are modified and equipped to perform calibration flights and ambulance assignments. One of the planes is rented out to support air ambulance transports in Scandinavia, and the other plane execute measure and calibration flights on behalf of the Swedish Civil Aviation Authority. These flights are performed in countries such as Sweden, Norway, Denmark, Faroe Islands, Iceland, Greenland, Lithuania, Spain and Iraq.

Other

During the years, BAM has included aircraft sales, aircraft part sales, avionics shop, sheet metal workshop and CSC (Customer Support Center with EASA DOA, POA and CAMO certificates in accordance with EASA part-M and EASA part-21 subpart G&J).

The company today employs more than 80 people with an annual turnover of 215 million SEK and Egert Lönn is the general manager.  In the year of 2009, BAM was celebrating 30 years in the business with the slogan -

”BAM! 30 years at your service – time flies”.

See also
Cessna Citation
Learjet
Beechcraft

External links
BAM official webpage

Aerospace companies of Sweden
Defence companies of Sweden
Companies based in Stockholm
Aircraft maintenance companies
Air navigation service providers
Swedish companies established in 1979